Júnior Aparecido Guimaro de Souza (born 28 May 1989), simply known as Juninho, is a Brazilian footballer who plays as a winger.

Club career

São Paulo
Juninho began his career with São Paulo at the age of 16. He signed a contract at seventeen and led the São Paulo youth squad to Copa de Juvenil glory.

Cuiabá
After with São Paulo, he moved to Cuiabá Esporte Clube in Campeonato Brasileiro Série C. Juninho scored his first goal on 18 May 2010 in a home match to Rio Branco.

Botoșani
On 25 January 2012, Juninho completed his move to Romanian side FC Botoșani signing a one-year deal. Before start his injury, he just made 9 appearances and scored two goals in Liga I.

BBCU (loan)
Juninho made a surprise move to BBCU F.C. at Thai Premier League on 4 June 2012 in a six-month contract on loan, where he quickly gained first team experience in Southeast Asia Club at Thailand. On 24 May Juninho scored a chip shot with his right foot in a 3–1 win against Army United F.C. in a Thai Premier League match. At the end of the season Juninho just made with 7 appearances and 6 goals.

Muangthong United
Juninho joined Muangthong United club at Thai Premier League but was then loaned out to Phuket FC at Thai Division 1 League in 2013. He made his debut in a 3–2 away victory against Sriracha F.C., and scored his first goal for the team against Krabi F.C. in a 2–2 home draw on 5 March 2013. Juninho went on to score 7 goals in his first season and made 18 appearances with Phuket FC before he joined TOT S.C. in Thai division 1 half season on loan. Juninho has completely finished 2013 season with 28 appearances and 11 goals and Thai Division 1 League.

Selangor
Juninho joined Malaysia Super League club, Selangor signing a two-year deal.

International career
Born in Brazil, Juninho played for Timor-Leste national football team between 2015 and 2016.

On 19 January 2017, the Asian Football Confederation declared Juninho and eleven other Brazilian footballers ineligible to represent Timor Leste.

Career statistics

Club

References

External links
 Juninho at Etminanbrazil 
 Juninho at ZeroZero

1989 births
Living people
Footballers from São Paulo
Brazilian footballers
Association football midfielders
Cuiabá Esporte Clube players
FC Botoșani players
BBCU F.C. players
Muangthong United F.C. players
TOT S.C. players
Phuket F.C. players
Selangor FA players
Avaí FC players
Sarawak FA players
Boa Esporte Clube players
Kuala Lumpur City F.C. players
Esporte Clube Pelotas players
Campeonato Brasileiro Série A players
Campeonato Brasileiro Série B players
Campeonato Brasileiro Série D players
Liga II players
Thai League 1 players
Thai League 2 players
Malaysia Super League players
Brazilian expatriate footballers
Brazilian expatriate sportspeople in Romania
Expatriate footballers in Romania
Brazilian expatriate sportspeople in Thailand
Expatriate footballers in Thailand
Brazilian expatriate sportspeople in Malaysia
Expatriate footballers in Malaysia
Brazilian expatriate sportspeople in Qatar
Expatriate footballers in Qatar

Timor-Leste international footballers
East Timorese footballers